Fearful Symmetries may refer to:

Fearful Symmetries, a novel by S. Andrew Swann
Fearful Symmetries (ballet), a ballet by Peter Martins
Fearful Symmetries (music), an orchestral work by John Adams (composer)
Fearful symmetry, a phrase from William Blake's poem "The Tyger"

See also
Fearful Symmetry (disambiguation)